Mancs (1994–2006), a male German Shepherd Dog, was the most famous rescue dog of the Spider Special Rescue Team of Miskolc, Hungary. His name means "paw".  Mancs' special talent was locating earthquake survivors who lay trapped deep beneath the rubble, and alerting rescuers. He could locate people buried under the earthquake rubble and not only differentiate whether the person was dead or alive, but could also indicate this to the other members of the rescue crew.  If he sensed a dead person, he laid down; when he sensed a live person beneath the rubble, he stood up, wagged his tail and barked.

Mancs and his owner, László Lehóczki, took part in several earthquake rescue missions, including the 2001 earthquakes in El Salvador and India.  Mancs became famous when he helped rescue a 3-year-old girl who spent 82 hours under the ruins after the Izmit earthquake of 1999 in Turkey.

In December 2004, a statue of Mancs was erected in downtown Miskolc, near the Szinva stream and the new public square. The statue was cast by sculptor Borbála Szanyi.

Mancs died on October 22, 2006, of pneumonia. In 2015, his rescue team was awarded the European Citizen's Prize for their 20 years of work in saving lives. Hatira Kaplan, the girl Mancs saved in 1999, attended the ceremony as a guest of honor and visited the statue of Mancs in Miskolc.

Mancs in the media

In an article published in Dialectical Anthropology, Melinda Kovács discusses the press coverage of Mancs' world-wide rescue efforts as a notable example of Hungary's international assistance to other countries, particularly Turkey.  Kovács writes:

Film
A feature film titled Mancs (released internationally as Paw) was released in late 2014, after several years of delay. The film, which alternates between live action and animation, was only loosely based on the life of Mancs. It was directed by Róbert Adrián Pejó and wasn't well received in Hungary; critics especially disliked that the film, aiming to be family friendly, downplayed tragic events such as earthquakes, and was set in a time period impossible to determine, with some scenes and elements reminding the viewer of the 1980s, some of them of the 1990s and some of the 2000s. In 2015 it won main prize at the Schlingel International Film Festival. The jury praised the animations and the family-friendly approach. The film was released in Germany with the title Mika – Dein Bester Freund ein grosser Held! ("Mika – Your Best Friend is a Great Hero").

References

Sources
 Spider Special Rescue Team
 Mancs in Turkey
 Article mentioning Mancs in the Budapest Sun
 Mancs at his new statue (a short article in Hungarian with photo)

1994 animal births
2006 animal deaths
Dog monuments
German shepherds
Individual dogs
Miskolc
Deaths from pneumonia in Hungary